Annelinn (Estonian for "Anne's Town") is a neighbourhood of Tartu, Estonia, located on the left bank of Emajõgi River. It has a population of 27,755 (as of 31 December 2013), or 27.34% of the whole city's population. Annelinn mainly consists of 5 and 9-story Soviet apartment buildings. The project was made between 1969–1973 by Mart Port and Maie Meelak from "Eesti Projekt". It was originally planned to consist of four microdistricts but only two were finished. Annelinn is planned with the shape of amphitheater with ascending relief, and an imaginary centre located on the watermeadow of the Emajõgi River.

Schools
Tartu Jaak Petersoni Gymnasium
Tartu Descartes Lyceum
Tartu Kivilinna School
Tartu Hansa School
Tartu Vene Lyceum

Gallery

See also
Anne Canal
Friendship Bridge, Tartu
Anne Nature Reserve

References

External links

Tartu